William "Billy V" Van Osdol is a veteran radio broadcast personality, television reporter and personality, entertainer, emcee, and actor in Honolulu, Hawaii. He has been at the forefront of numerous events in the Hawaii entertainment, hospitality, and sports industries, and most notably at many of Hawaii's biggest events including the Na Hoku Hanohano Awards and the Merrie Monarch Festival.

Billy V has also played Ed Romero, a conservation officer, from 2012 to 2018 on the CBS hit police action TV series, Hawaii Five-0 (2010 TV series).

Radio

KCCN FM100 (1990-2006)

Billy V was instrumental in developing the KCCN-FM radio station. He helped develop the programming with Honolulu Skylark, assisted in building studios and production rooms, implemented on-air programs, and worked with initial sales teams before being called to assist Hawaiian 105 KINE-FM. During his time on the station, KCCN-FM become Honolulu's #1 Radio Station in 2000, according to Neilson.

Hawaiian 105 KINE (2006-2021)

After much success at KCCN-FM, Billy V was asked to assist in Hawaiian 105 Hawaiian 105 KINE. Billy V opened the Morning Show, "Nāʻau Therapy," with Mele Apana. The show earned the station's highest ratings in years. Billy V along with Mele Apana have been largely responsible for bringing Hawaiian music back to Hawaiian 105 Hawaiian 105 KINE.

In 2014, Billy V left Hawaiian 105 KINE after the departure of Mele Apana.

After nearly five years, Billy V returned to Hawaiian 105 KINE for the Saturday 12-6PM timeslot playing songs from Hawaii's top musicians and sharing behind-the-scenes stories from celebrities and other special guests.

In 2021, SummitMedia Corporation, owner of Hawaiian 105 Hawaiian 105 KINE, issued a mass layoff which included many Hawaii radio personalities including Billy V, Shannon Scott, and Wayne Maria.

Television

Hawaii News Now
Billy V joined the television news broadcast, Hawaii News Now, as a spotlight Entertainment Reporter from Hawaiian 105 KINE. Periodically, he would fill in for Breaking News, Traffic, and Weather segments. He joined the Hawaii News Now-Sunrise team full-time in December 2015.

His role at the TV station lead to anchoring prominent Hawaii broadcasts including the Queen Liliuokalani Hula Competition, the Merrie Monarch Festival and the Na Hoku Hanohano Awards.

Na Hoku Hanohano Awards
Billy V has anchored the Hawaii Academy of Recording Arts' televised Hawaii music award ceremony, the Na Hoku Hanohano Awards, for more than 20 years.

Hawaii Five-0 (2010 TV series)
Billy V has also played Ed Romero, a conservation officer, from 2012 to 2018 on the CBS hit police action TV series, Hawaii Five-0 (2010 TV series).

Past Television Events

Sports

University of Hawaii Athletics
In 1999, Billy V started emceeing for the Rainbow Classic collegiate basketball tournament sponsored by Outrigger Hotels & Resorts. He then joined the University of Hawaii as a Game Day Activities Coordinator assisting with game announcing, client relations, and game day coordination. Currently, his voice can be heard announcing several University of Hawaii sports including women's volleyball, men's basketball and football.

Other Works
Hawaiian Airlines In-Flight Program
 Honolulu Festival

References

External links

Living people
American male actors
American television journalists
People from Hawaii
American male journalists
Year of birth missing (living people)